Alofa is a genus of flower bugs in the tribe Cardiastethini, erected by JL Herring in 1976.

References

External links
 

Anthocoridae